Qasem Alvan (also Romanized as Qāsem ʿAlvān) is a village in Hoveyzeh Rural District, in the Central District of Hoveyzeh County, Khuzestan Province, Iran. At the 2006 census, its population was 45, in 7 families.

References 

Populated places in Hoveyzeh County